Ozothamnus turbinatus, the coast everlasting, is a shrub in the family Asteraceae, native to the states of New South Wales, Victoria, South Australia and Tasmania in Australia. It grows to between 1 and 2 metres in height.

References

turbinatus
Asterales of Australia
Flora of New South Wales
Flora of Tasmania
Flora of Victoria (Australia)